Manganese(II) acetate are chemical compounds with the formula  where n = 0, 2, 4. These materials are white or pale pink solids. Some of these compounds are used as a catalyst and as fertilizer.

Preparation
Manganese(II) acetate can be formed by treating either manganese(II,III) oxide or manganese(II) carbonate with acetic acid:

Structure
The anhydrous material and dihydrate  are coordination polymers. The dihydrate has been characterized by X-ray crystallography. Each Mn(II) center is surrounded by six oxygen centers provided by aquo ligands and acetates.

References

Manganese(II) compounds
Acetates